Nuclear receptor coactivator 4,  also known as Androgen Receptor Activator (ARA70), is a protein that in humans is encoded by the NCOA4 gene. It plays an important role in ferritinophagy, acting as a cargo receptor, binding to the ferritin heavy chain and latching on to ATG8 on the surface of the autophagosome.

Interactions 

NCOA4 has been shown to interact with:
 Androgen receptor, and
 Peroxisome proliferator-activated receptor gamma
 Ferritin
 ATG8

See also 
 Transcription coregulator

References

Further reading

External links 
 

Gene expression
Transcription coregulators